The Queen of Flow (Spanish: La Reina del Flow) is a Colombian telenovela produced by Sony Pictures Television and Teleset for Caracol Televisión. It is a musical telenovela based on the genre of reggaeton. The series stars Carolina Ramírez, Carlos Torres, and Andrés Sandoval.

On 9 October 2018, Caracol Televisión confirmed that the show has been renewed for a second season. The second season premiered on 26 April 2021.

Plot 
The Queen of Flow is set in Medellin, Colombia. The first five episodes take place in the early 2000s and are important to the plot of this telenovela.

Yeimy Montoya (María José Vargas) is a 17-year-old Colombian teenager who is in high school and lives in a comuna. She is close to her parents and grandmother. She helps her parents in their bakery business. Yeimy also has a gift for writing catchy reggaeton rhymes and musical rhythms.

Yeimy is in love with Charly Cruz (Juan Manuel Restrepo), her classmate and neighbor. He has a girlfriend, Gema Granados, and he is unaware of Yeimy's crush on him. She has written many songs about Charly in her secret notebook, which she guards as if it were her child. Yeimy meets one of Charly's friends, Juan Camilo, 'Juancho', (Guillermo Blanco) who attends the same school and lives in the comuna. He convinces Yeimy to join their reggaeton group, Soul & Bass. A love triangle soon forms as Juancho begins to fall for Yeimy. She is oblivious about his feelings for her as she starts to become friendlier and closer with Charly. He is attracted to her. But he is simultaneously jealous of her ability to easily compose rhythmic flows, a talent he sorely lacks.

Charly's uncle is a local and powerful narco-trafficker, Dúver Cruz, 'Manín' (Lucho Velasco). Yeimy's parents are murdered in their bakery because they refused to pay protection bribes to him. Yeimy and her grandmother are devastated by this horrific crime. The police are bribed and ordered by Manín to quash the investigation into the Montoya's murder. Yeimy becomes closer to Juancho and Charly. The group recorded music and begin to get attention from a local radio station. They secure a meeting with music producers in New York City.

Manín orders Charly and his men to rob a health clinic. Coincidentally, Yeimy is at this clinic with her grandmother. Although Charly is wearing a ski mask, she recognizes his Soul & Bass tattoo. She sees him shoot a security guard during the heist. Charly tells Manín that he did not mean to shoot the guard and is worried that someone may have recognized him. Manín assures him that he will take care of any problems. Yeimy confronts Charly about the robbery. He tells her that this was the first time that he committed a crime and that he did it only because he wanted to raise money for Soul & Bass's trip to NYC. Charly promises to never do that again and he begins to seduce Yeimy so that she will not tell on him.
 
Charly informs Manín that Yeimy knows that he was involved with the robbery. He makes a deal with Manín so that he will not kill her. He tells him that they should pack a suitcase to give her with cocaine so that she will be arrested in NY for being a drug mule. She will be given a long prison sentence and that will be the best way to get rid of her. The night before their flight to NY, Charly goes to Yeimy's house to give her the suitcase with cocaine. He packs her clothes and her song notebook in it so that she will not see the drugs. He continues to seduce her and they have sexual relations. As Yeimy sleeps, Charly steals her notebook from the suitcase and puts it in his luggage.

As the three members of Soul & Bass are in US customs in NY, Yeimy is arrested for the cocaine. She is distraught and denies that it is hers. Manín has a contact in the prison where she is being held. She physically assaults Yeimy and tells her that if she mentions Manín or Charly that her grandmother, Dona Carmen, will be killed. Yeimy realizes that Charly set her up and she is further devastated by his betrayal.

Juancho is confused as to why Yeimy would transport drugs as that was out of character for her. He tells Charly that they should help her. Charly accuses Yeimy of being a drug mule. He says that she endangered all of them and he wants nothing to do with her. Juancho and him get into a fight, end their friendship, and dissolve the group. Charly meets with the executives in NYC. He sings Yeimy's song, 'Reflejo' and made a good impression on them. He takes credit for the song and says that he has composed many more of them. They give him the opportunity to launch his musical career in Puerto Rico. Juancho returns to Colombia and forms a musical equipment business.

Yeimy pleads guilty to the crimes she is accused of and is sentenced to a 25-year-prison term. Over the years, Juancho writes several letters to her. She does not read or answer any of them as she wants to focus on surviving in prison. Yeimy forms friendships with other women in prison. They teach her how to fight and protect herself. She discovers that she is pregnant and has the baby in prison. She names the baby Mateo. Dona Carmen flies to NY to visit her. She promises Yeimy that she will raise Mateo while she is in prison, that she will move out of the comuna, and that she will not tell Charly that he has a son. Manín finds out about Mateo. He murders Dona Carmen and then sets fire to the building she was living in to steal the baby. Yeimy is once again devastated and believes that her son and grandmother are dead.

Seventeen years pass. Charly Flow (Carlos Torres) is a famous and rich reggaeton singer. Yeimy's lyrics and music made him very successful. He is married to Gema (Mabel Moreno) and they have a daughter, Vanesa. He is self-centered, a womanizer, and an alcoholic who engages in criminal activity like money laundering for his uncle. These character flaws are overlooked because he is famous, handsome, and charming. He is relocating to Medellin after living many years in Puerto Rico to establish his own production studio, Excelsior Studios. Juancho (Andrés Sandoval) has a successful musical equipment business, is still living with his younger siblings, and is dating Catalina Bedoya, one of Yeimy's childhood friends.

In return for a reduced prison sentence, Yeimy (Carolina Ramírez) is offered the opportunity to become an undercover agent for the DEA to help capture Manín. She also plans to use this opportunity to get close to Charly and exact revenge for the 17 years she wrongfully spent in prison because of him. When Manín finds out about Yeimy's deal from his informant, he orders her murder. The attempt is unsuccessful but the DEA announces that Yeimy Montoya and one of her associates is killed in the prison. This news travels to Colombia. Charly is relieved that Yeimy will no longer be a threat and reveal to the world he is a fraud and a criminal. Juancho is heartbroken. After all those years, he is still in love with Yeimy. He decides that it is time to move on and settle down with Catalina.

The DEA with the help of Jack del Castillo, a Puerto Rican music producer, form a false identity for Yeimy and train her to become this new person. When she returns to Colombia, she is Tammy Andrade, a successful music producer. She makes her debut as Tammy at Charly's Excelsior Studios inauguration party. She introduces herself to Charly who is drawn and attracted to her. He does not recognize that she is Yeimy. No one recognizes her after so many years and thinking that Yeimy is dead. Tammy integrates herself into Charly's life and studio, and reconnects with Juancho.

Yeimy accomplishes her goal of destroying Charly's career and helps to dissolve his marriage to Gema. His corrupt nature makes his downfall inevitable. There are many, sometimes violent and tragic, twists and turns. Reggaeton music by several of this novela's characters are a prominent feature of most episodes. In the end, Charly and other characters get what they deserve. Yeimy lets go of her hatred for Charly and learns that through forgiveness she will find peace, freedom, and love.

Season 2 

The second season follows Yeimy Montoya (Carolina Ramírez), who after achieving fame and success in music, decides to give herself a chance in love with Juancho Mesa (Andrés Sandoval), not knowing that soon in her life, an enemy appears who knows her and all of her loved ones very well. Meanwhile, Carlos Cruz/Charly Flow (Carlos Torres) makes merits to get out of prison.

Cast

Main 
 Carolina Ramírez as Yeimy Montoya / Tammy Andrade
 Carlos Torres as Carlos Cruz "Charly Flow"
 Andrés Sandoval as Juan Camilo Mesa "Juancho"
Juan Manuel Restrepo as young Charly Cruz & Erik "Mateo" Cruz Montoya 'Pez Koi'
María José Vargas Agudelo as young Yeimy Montoya
 Luis Guillermo Blanco Rossi as young Juan Camilo Mesa, 'Juancho,'
 Mabel Moreno as Gema Granados de Cruz
 Adriana Arango as Ligia de Cruz
 Lucho Velasco as Dúver Cruz "Manín"
 Pacho Rueda as Lucio
 Diana Wiswell as Catalina Bedoya
 Mariana Garzón as Vanessa Cruz Granados
 Kiño as Axel
 Sebastián Silva as Alberto Espitia "Pite"
 Mariana Gomez as Irma
 Juliana Moreno as Lina Mesa
 Lina Cardona as Carolina Pizarro
 Valentina Lizcano as Zulma López

Guest stars 
 Sebastián Yatra as Himself
 Manuel Turizo as Himself 
 Karol G as Herself
 Joey Montana as Himself
Rauw Alejandro as Himself

Production 
Principal photography began on 26 August 2017.

Reception 
The premiere of the telenovela occupied position No. 1, being the most watched program in Colombia at a national level. Its premiere averages a total of 15.4 points, surpassing the most watched programs of Caracol Televisión as Sin senos sí hay paraíso, and Desafío súper humanos.

After the first episode several viewers drew conclusions that the series would be based on the life of the singer Maluma, due to the appearance, tattoos and dress of the character Charly Flow played by Carlos Torres. Torres says that Maluma was a reference for the creation of this character, as well as Sebastián Yatra, J Balvin, Piso 21 and Reykon, among others.

The telenovela joined the Top 10 of Most Successful Programs since private television started in Colombia in 1998. This telenovela gathered several times more than 20 points of audience (considering 16 points as a TV 'boom'), these ratings had not unseen and unscored since 2012.

Ratings

Awards and nominations

Adaptations 
After the success in Colombia, Televisa made an adaptation of the telenovela with the title of La reina soy yo.

References 

Sony Pictures Television telenovelas
2018 telenovelas
2018 Colombian television series debuts
Colombian telenovelas
Caracol Televisión telenovelas
Spanish-language telenovelas
Spanish-language Netflix original programming
International Emmy Award for Best Telenovela
Television productions suspended due to the COVID-19 pandemic
Television series by Teleset
Television shows remade overseas